Not Fade Away may refer to:

Music
 "Not Fade Away" (song), a 1957 song by Buddy Holly, covered by many others
 Not Fade Away (Nitty Gritty Dirt Band album), a 1992 album by the Nitty Gritty Dirt Band
 Not Fade Away (Remembering Buddy Holly), a 1996 tribute album
 Not Fade Away (David Kitt album), a 2006 album by David Kitt

Television episodes
 "Not Fade Away" (Angel), the series finale
 "Not Fade Away" (Fear the Walking Dead)
 "Not Fade Away", episode of Hercules: The Legendary Journeys

Other uses
 Not Fade Away (film), a 2012 film directed by David Chase
 Not Fade Away, a play by Richard Cameron
 Not Fade Away, a novel by Jim Dodge